Heikant is a former hamlet in the Dutch province of North Brabant. It was located in the municipality of Gilze en Rijen, about 1 km west of the centre of Rijen.

According to the 19th-century historian A.J. van der Aa, Heikant (or "De Heikant") consisted of 8 houses and had a population of 60 in the middle of the 19th century. Heikant was still named as a separate hamlet in 1997, but nowadays it no longer exists: a residential neighbourhood of the town of Rijen now covers the area.

Heikant should not be confused with any of the other hamlets named Heikant in the Netherlands.

References

External links
Map of Gilze en Rijen in 1868, showing the hamlet Heikant the west of Rijen

Populated places in North Brabant
Gilze en Rijen